Eduardo "Skay" Beilinson (born January 15, 1952) is an Argentine guitarist who has played in the band Patricio Rey y sus Redonditos de Ricota, one of the most famous rock bands of Argentina. He is considered one of the best guitarists of his country, Rolling Stone magazine ranked him 6th on his list of "100 Best Argentine Guitarists". Among his influences are Jimi Hendrix, Cream, Keith Richards, Pink Floyd, Buddy Guy, Vanilla Fudge and The Byrds.

Career

1968–1977: Early years 
Skay Beilinson was born in La Plata, Buenos Aires, and started playing the guitar when he was 12 years old; his teacher was Leopoldo Ezcurra. In 1968, played with his brother in Diplodocum Red & Brown, and then in La Cofradia de la Flor Solar to the early 1970s, together with Kubero Diaz.

During the decade of the 1970s and early 1980s, was leader and guitarist of the band Taxi Rural and then was member from "La Galletita" with Edelmiro Molinari, with who recorded one full LP in 1982, through Microfon label.

1978–2001: Patricio Rey y sus Redonditos de Ricota 

In 1978, with Carlos "Indio" Solari and Carmen "Poly" Castro formed "Patricio Rey y sus Redonditos de Ricota" that established him as the core musician in the group. The band managed to be among the most important exponents of 1980s Argentine rock with Sumo, Virus, Soda Stereo, Charly García, among others.

By the 1990s, Patricio Rey became one of the most famous bands in Argentina. It became the band's mainstream success with La Mosca y la Sopa, Lobo Suelto - Cordero Atado and Luzbelito. Also, the band began to travel to Tandil and Junín stadiums to play their shows, increasing the audience.
 
In 1997, Skay, Poly and Indio were the only band members who had been in all their formations, and therefore decided to take more control over the band's future decisions, until Indio decided split Patricio Rey in 2001, for a while due to creative differences with the musicians.

2002–present: Solo recordings 
Skay started playing as solo artist in 2002, and published his first solo album A través del Mar de los Sargazos. In 2004, published Talismán. After that, published his third album La marca de Caín, with the name of "Skay y los Seguidores de la Diosa Kali". In 2010, they published their fourth album ¿Dónde Vas?.

In August 2013, Skay together with his now-called band "Los Fakires" released La Luna Hueca, with Oscar Reyna as rhythm guitar, Claudio Quartero on bass, Javier Lecumberry on keyboards and "Topo" Espíndola as drummer.

In late 2013, Beilinson rejected a proposal of his former bandmate Indio Solari to meet with other members of Los Redondos.

Equipment 
Skay Beilinson has used many different guitar models, in an interview, said that have a variety of Gibson guitars, as SG and Les Paul. Some of his notable instruments are:

Discography

With Patricio Rey y sus Redonditos de Ricota 
Gulp! (1985)
Oktubre (1986)
Un Baión para el Ojo Idiota (1987)
¡Bang! ¡Bang!!... Estás Liquidado (1989)
La Mosca y la Sopa (1991)
En Directo (1992)
Lobo Suelto - Cordero Atado (1993)
Luzbelito (1996)
Último Bondi a Finisterre (1998)
Momo Sampler (2000)

With La Cofradía de la Flor Solar 
La Cofradía de la Flor Solar (1971)
El café de los ciegos (1997)
Cofrádica (1998)

With Skay y los seguidores de la diosa Kali 
A través del mar de los sargazos (2002)
Talismán (2004)
La Marca de Caín (2007)
¿Dónde vas? (2010)
La Luna Hueca (2013)
El Engranaje de Cristal (2016)
En el Corazón del Laberinto (2019)

With Edelmiro Molinari 
Edelmiro y la Galletita (1983)

With Pedro Conde 
Sin Presupuesto (1985)

With El Soldado 
Tren de fugitivos (1997)

References

External links
Skay Beilinson at Rock.com.ar

1952 births
Living people
People from La Plata
Argentine guitarists
Argentine male guitarists
Jewish Argentine musicians
Argentine Jews
20th-century guitarists
20th-century Argentine musicians
20th-century male musicians
21st-century guitarists
21st-century Argentine musicians
21st-century male musicians